Lacquer dermatitis (also known as "Lacquer sensitivity") is a cutaneous condition characterized by a contact dermatitis to various lacquers.

See also 
 Toxicodendron dermatitis
 List of cutaneous conditions

References 

Contact dermatitis